Bimanbandar Thana is a thana of Dhaka City.

History
Bimanbandar thana was created in 2001. It is composed of parts of Ward no 1, Ward no 98, and Dakkhinkhan.

Geography 
It is bounded by pallabi, uttara and Dhakshinkhan Thana on the north, Khilkhet and cantonment thanas on the south, Khilkhet and Dakshinkhan thanas on the east, Cantonment and Pallabi thanas on the west.

Population 
Total 5079.
male 3016.
female 2063.
Muslim 4921
Hindu 137.
and Others 21.

References

Thanas of Dhaka